Cytochrome b-c1 complex subunit 2, mitochondrial (UQCRC2), also known as QCR2, UQCR2, or MC3DN5 is a protein that in humans is encoded by the UQCRC2 gene. The product of UQCRC2 is a subunit of the respiratory chain protein Ubiquinol Cytochrome c Reductase (UQCR, Complex III or Cytochrome bc1 complex), which consists of the products of one mitochondrially encoded gene, MTCYTB (mitochondrial cytochrome b) and ten nuclear genes: UQCRC1, UQCRC2, Cytochrome c1, UQCRFS1 (Rieske protein), UQCRB, "11kDa protein", UQCRH (cyt c1 Hinge protein), Rieske Protein presequence, "cyt. c1 associated protein", and "Rieske-associated protein." Defects in UQCRC2 are associated with mitochondrial complex III deficiency, nuclear, type 5.

Structure 
UQCRC2 is located on the p arm of chromosome 16 in position 12.2 and has 14 exons. The UQCRC2 gene produces a 48.4 kDa protein composed of 453 amino acids. UQCRC2 belongs to the peptidase M16 family and UQCRC2/QCR2 subfamily. UQCRC2 has a transit peptide domain. Ubiquinol Cytochrome c Reductase (b-c1 complex) contains 11 subunits: 3 respiratory subunits (cytochrome b, cytochrome c1 and Rieske/UQCRFS1), 2 core proteins (UQCRC1/QCR1 and UQCRC2/QCR2) and 6 low-molecular weight proteins (UQCRH/QCR6, UQCRB/QCR7, UQCRQ/QCR8, UQCR10/QCR9, UQCR11/QCR10 and a cleavage product of Rieske/UQCRFS1). UQCRC2 is part of the hydrophobic core of the b-c1 complex and is necessary for the stabilization of Ubiquinol Cytochrome c Reductase.

Function 
The protein encoded by this gene is located in the mitochondrion, where it is part of the ubiquinol-cytochrome c reductase complex (also known as complex III). This complex constitutes a part of the mitochondrial respiratory chain. The core protein UQCRC2 is required for the assembly and stabilization of the complex.

Clinical Significance 
Variants of UQCRC2 have been associated with mitochondrial complex III deficiency, nuclear, type 5. Mitochondrial complex III deficiency nuclear type 5 is a disorder of the mitochondrial respiratory chain resulting in a highly variable phenotype depending on which tissues are affected. Clinical features include mitochondrial encephalopathy, psychomotor retardation, ataxia, severe failure to thrive, liver dysfunction, renal tubulopathy, muscle weakness, exercise intolerance, lactic acidosis and hypoglycemia. Homozygous mutations resulting in a change from Arginine to Tryptophan at position 183 have been associated with mitochondrial complex III deficiency due to UQCRC2 dysfunction. Autosomal recessive inheritance has been proposed as a transmission pattern.

Interactions 
UQCRC2 has 98 protein-protein interactions with 90 of them being co-complex interactions. CAC1A, QCR1, UQCRC1, CACNA1A, STOM, a8k1f4, HLA-B, ARF6, and Mapk3 have been found to interact with UQCRC2.

References

Further reading 

 
 
 

Human proteins